Thomas J. Duffey  (December 26, 1927 - December 18, 2016) was a member of the Wisconsin State Assembly.

Biography
Duffey was born in Milwaukee, Wisconsin. He graduated from Marquette University High School and Marquette University. From 1945 to 1948, Duffey served in the United States Navy. He is a member of the American Legion and AMVETS.

Political career
Duffey was elected to the Assembly in 1954. He was a Democrat.

References

Politicians from Milwaukee
Military personnel from Milwaukee
United States Navy sailors
Marquette University alumni
1927 births
2016 deaths
Marquette University High School alumni
Democratic Party members of the Wisconsin State Assembly